P.U.S.P.A Repackage is the third studio album by Indonesia pop band ST 12. On this album there are 2 new songs are Isabella and Biarkan Jatuh Cinta.

Track listing
 Putri Iklan (New Version) 
 Biarkan Jatuh Cinta 
 SKJ (Saat Kau Jauh) (New Version) 
 Isabella (Beat Version)
 Saat Terakhir 
 Cari Pacar Lagi 
 Cinta Tak Direstui 
 P.U.S.P.A 
 Jangan Pernah Berubah 
 Tak Dapat Apa-Apa (My Hot) 
 Cinta Jangan Dinanti 
 Isabella (Slow Version) 
 KebesaranMu 
 MemujaMu

References

ST 12 albums
2009 albums